Gustav Fröhlich (also Frölich; 1902 in German Samoa – 17 April 1968 in Sydney, Australia) was a German-Australian swimmer and swimming coach.

During the 1920s he swam for the SC Hellas swimming club in Magdeburg. On 2 October 1921 he set a world record of 1.14 minutes for the 100 metres backstroke. Between 1921 and 1926 he was five times 100 metres backstroke champion in the German Championships. He won two European medals, gold in Budapest in 1926 and bronze in the following year, 1927, both in backstroke, as well as five national titles between 1921 and 1926.

He migrated to Australia during the 1930s where he became a noted swimming coach. He coached Lorraine Crapp to two gold records at the Melbourne Olympics in 1956. He also coached Faith Leech who won medals at the Melbourne Olympics in 1956 and Judy-Joy Davies who won a medal at the London Olympics in 1948.

Gustav-Frölich-Allee in Magdeburg is named after him.

References

1902 births
1968 deaths
German male swimmers
Male backstroke swimmers
European Aquatics Championships medalists in swimming
German people in German Samoa
German emigrants to Australia
20th-century German people